A crucifix (from the Latin  meaning '(one) fixed to a cross') is a cross with an image of Jesus on it, as distinct from a bare cross.

The crucifix is a principal symbol for many groups of Christians, and one of the most common forms of the Crucifixion in the arts. It is especially important in the Roman Rite of the Roman Catholic Church, but is also used in the Eastern Orthodox Church, most Oriental Orthodox Churches (except the Armenian & Syriac Church), and the Eastern Catholic Churches, as well as by the Lutheran, Moravian and Anglican Churches. The symbol is less common in churches of other Protestant denominations, and in the Assyrian Church of the East and Armenian Apostolic Church, which prefer to use a cross without the figure of Jesus (the ). The crucifix emphasizes Jesus' sacrifice—his death by crucifixion, which Christians believe brought about the redemption of humankind. Most crucifixes portray Jesus on a Latin cross, rather than any other shape, such as a Tau cross or a Coptic cross.

Roman Catholics see the crucifix as the perfect fulfillment of that inferred by the serpent created by Moses in Numbers 21:8—9, called the Nehushtan. It was promised that those sinners who looked upon the Nehushtan would be healed. The section of Numbers about the Nehushtan is one of the readings on Exaltation of the Cross that occurs on September 14 in the Roman Catholic Church. It is paired with John 3:14–15 as the gospel reading. Taken together, these readings explain the striking front and center position of a large crucifix normally fixed above or behind a Catholic altar.

Western crucifixes usually have a three-dimensional , but in Eastern Orthodoxy Jesus' body is normally painted on the cross, or in low relief. Strictly speaking, to be a crucifix, the cross must be three-dimensional, but this distinction is not always observed. An entire painting of the crucifixion of Jesus including a landscape background and other figures is not a crucifix either.

Large crucifixes high across the central axis of a church are known by the Old English term rood. By the Late Middle Ages these were a near-universal feature of Western churches, but they are now very rare. Modern Roman Catholic churches and many Lutheran churches often have a crucifix above the altar on the wall; for the celebration of Mass, the Roman Rite of the Catholic Church requires that "on or close to the altar there is to be a cross with a figure of Christ crucified".

Description 

There may also be a short projecting nameplate, showing the letters INRI (Greek: INBI). The Russian Orthodox crucifix usually has an additional third crossbar, to which the feet are nailed, and which is angled upward toward the penitent thief Saint Dismas (to the viewer's left) and downward toward the impenitent thief Gestas (to the viewer's right). The corpus of Eastern crucifixes is normally a two-dimensional or low relief icon that shows Jesus as already dead, his face peaceful and somber. They are rarely three-dimensional figures as in the Western tradition, although these may be found where Western influences are strong, but are more typically icons painted on a piece of wood shaped to include the double-barred cross and perhaps the edge of Christ's hips and halo, and no background. More sculptural small crucifixes in metal relief are also used in Orthodoxy (see gallery examples), including as pectoral crosses and blessing crosses.

Western crucifixes may show Christ dead or alive, the presence of the spear wound in his ribs traditionally indicating that he is dead. In either case his face very often shows his suffering. In the Eastern Orthodox tradition he has normally been shown as dead since around the end of the period of Byzantine Iconoclasm. Eastern crucifixes have Jesus' two feet nailed side by side, rather than crossed one above the other, as Western crucifixes have shown them since around the 13th century. The crown of thorns is also generally absent in Eastern crucifixes, since the emphasis is not on Christ's suffering, but on his triumph over sin and death. The "S"-shaped position of Jesus' body on the cross is a Byzantine innovation of the late 10th century, though also found in the German Gero Cross of the same date. Probably more from Byzantine influence, it spread elsewhere in the West, especially to Italy, by the Romanesque period, though it was more usual in painting than sculpted crucifixes. It was in Italy that the emphasis was put on Jesus' suffering and realistic details, during a process of general humanization of Christ favored by the Franciscan order. During the 13th century the suffering Italian model triumphed over the traditional Byzantine one anywhere in Europe also due to the works of artists such as Giunta Pisano and Cimabue. Since the Renaissance the "S"-shape is generally much less pronounced. Eastern Christian blessing crosses will often have the Crucifixion depicted on one side, and the Resurrection on the other, illustrating Eastern Orthodox theology's understanding of the Crucifixion and Resurrection as two intimately related aspects of the same act of salvation.

Another, symbolic, depiction shows a triumphant Christ, clothed in robes, rather than stripped as for his execution, with arms raised, appearing to rise up from the cross, sometimes accompanied by "rays of light", or an aureole encircling his body. He may be robed as a prophet, crowned as a king, and vested in a stole as Great High Priest.

On some crucifixes a skull and crossbones are shown below the corpus, referring to Golgotha (Calvary), the site at which Jesus was crucified, which the Gospels say means in Hebrew "the place of the skull." Medieval tradition held that it was the burial-place of Adam and Eve, and that the cross of Christ was raised directly over Adam's skull, so many crucifixes manufactured in Catholic countries still show the skull and crossbones below the corpus.

Usage 
In the early Church, many Christians hung a cross on the eastern wall of their house in order to indicate the eastward direction of prayer. Prayer in front of a crucifix, which is seen as a sacramental, is often part of devotion for Christians, especially those worshipping in a church, also privately. The person may sit, stand, or kneel in front of the crucifix, sometimes looking at it in contemplation, or merely in front of it with head bowed or eyes closed. During the Middle Ages small crucifixes, generally hung on a wall, became normal in the personal cells or living quarters first of monks, then all clergy, followed by the homes of the laity, spreading down from the top of society as these became cheap enough for the average person to afford. Most towns had a large crucifix erected as a monument, or some other shrine at the crossroads of the town. Building on the ancient custom, many Catholics, Lutherans and Anglicans hang a crucifix inside their homes and also use the crucifix as a focal point of a home altar. The wealthy erected proprietary chapels as they could afford to do this.

Catholic (both  Eastern and  Western), Eastern Orthodox, Oriental Orthodox, Anglican Lutheran and some Reformed churches, PCUSA and Church of Scotland. Christians generally use the crucifix in public religious services. They believe use of the crucifix is in keeping with the statement by Paul the Apostle in 1 Corinthians: "we preach Christ crucified, a stumbling block to Jews and folly to Gentiles, but to those who are called, both Jews and Greeks, Christ the power of God and the wisdom of God".

In the West, altar crosses and processional crosses began to be crucifixes in the 11th century, which became general around the 14th century, as they became cheaper. The Roman Rite requires that "either on the altar or near it, there is to be a cross, with the figure of Christ crucified upon it, a cross clearly visible to the assembled people. It is desirable that such a cross should remain near the altar even outside of liturgical celebrations, so as to call to mind for the faithful the saving Passion of the Lord." The requirement of the altar cross was also mentioned in pre-1970 editions of the Roman Missal, though not in the original 1570 Roman Missal of Pope Pius V. The Rite of Funerals says that the Gospel Book, the Bible, or a cross (which will generally be in crucifix form) may be placed on the coffin for a Requiem Mass, but a second standing cross is not to be placed near the coffin if the altar cross can be easily seen from the body of the church.

Eastern Christian liturgical processions called crucessions  include a cross or crucifix at their head. In the Eastern Orthodox Church, the crucifix is often placed above the iconostasis in the church. In the Russian Orthodox Church a large crucifix ("Golgotha") is placed behind the Holy Table (altar). During Matins of Good Friday, a large crucifix is taken in procession to the center of the church, where it is venerated by the faithful. Sometimes the soma is removable and is taken off the crucifix at Vespers that evening during the Gospel lesson describing the Descent from the Cross. The empty cross may then remain in the centre of the church until the Paschal vigil (local practices vary). The blessing cross which the priest uses to bless the faithful at the dismissal will often have the crucifix on one side and an icon of the Resurrection of Jesus on the other, the side with the Resurrection being used on Sundays and during Paschaltide, and the crucifix on other days.

Exorcist Gabriele Amorth has stated that the crucifix is one of the most effective means of averting or opposing demons. In folklore, it is believed to ward off vampires, incubi, succubi, and other evils.

Modern anti-Christians have used an inverted (upside-down) crucifix when showing disdain for Jesus Christ or the Catholic Church which believes in his divinity. According to Christian tradition, Saint Peter was martyred by being crucified upside-down.

Controversies

Protestant Reformation 
In the Moravian Church, Nicolaus Zinzendorf had an experience in which he believed he encountered Jesus. Seeing a painting of a crucifix, Zinzendorf fell on his knees vowing to glorify Jesus after contemplating on the wounds of Christ and an inscription that stated "This is what I have done for you, what will you do for me?".

The Lutheran Churches retained the use of the crucifix, "justifying their continued use of medieval crucifixes with the same arguments employed since the Middle Ages, as is evident from the example of the altar of the Holy Cross in the Cistercian church of Doberan." Martin Luther did not object to them, and this was among his differences with Andreas Karlstadt as early as 1525. At the time of the Reformation, Luther retained the crucifix in the Lutheran Church and they remain the center of worship in Lutheran parishes across Europe. In the United States, however, Lutheranism came under the influence of Calvinism, and the plain cross came to be used in many churches. In contrast to the practice of the Moravian Church and Lutheran Churches, the early Reformed Churches rejected the use of the crucifix, and indeed the unadorned cross, along with other traditional religious imagery, as idolatrous. Calvin, considered to be the father of the Reformed Church, was violently opposed to both cross and crucifix. In England, the Royal Chapels of Elizabeth I were most unusual among local churches in retaining crucifixes, following the Queen's conservative tastes. These disappeared under her successor, James I, and their brief re-appearance in the early 1620s when James' heir was seeking a Spanish marriage was the subject of rumour and close observation by both Catholics and Protestants; when the match fell through they disappeared.

Modern 
In 2005, a mother accused her daughter's school in Derby, England, of discriminating against Christians after the teenager was suspended for refusing to take off a crucifix necklace.

In 2008, a chapel in a prison in England replaced its crucifix and static altar with a cross and portable altar when it was renovated as a multi-faith chapel. Right-leaning media reported that the crucifix had been removed "in case it offends Muslims".

In 2008 in Spain, a local judge ordered crucifixes removed from public schools to settle a decades-old dispute over whether crucifixes should be displayed in public buildings in a non-confessional state.

On 18 March 2011, the European Court of Human Rights ruled in the Lautsi v. Italy case, that the requirement in Italian law that crucifixes be displayed in classrooms of state schools does not violate the European Convention on Human Rights. Crucifixes are common in most other Italian official buildings, including courts of law.

On 24 March 2011, the Constitutional Court of Peru ruled that the presence of crucifixes in courts of law does not violate the secular nature of the state.

Gallery

See also 

Cloisters Cross
Christian symbolism
Cross necklace
Crucifer
Crucifix Decrees
Crucifixion in the arts
Feast of the Cross
Holy Face of Lucca
Jesus, King of the Jews
Master of the Blue Crucifixes
Papal ferula
Rood
Rosary

Notes

References

External links 

Archæology of the Cross and Crucifix
The Cross and Crucifix in Liturgy

Christian iconography
Iconography of Jesus
Sacramentals
Christian religious objects
Crosses by form
Christian symbols
 
Christian terminology
 
Anglican liturgy
Lutheran liturgy and worship
Objects believed to protect from evil